is a Japanese gravure idol, tarento artist and actress formerly affiliated to the A-Team Entertainment Production Agency.

Career 
Yuriko graduated at Sendai Vocational School in April 2004 and moved to the capital, hoping to become an actress, where she works part-time at sport shops, supermarkets and video rental stores. During this time she also manages to get small roles in plays and work as an event assistant. She started taking acting and sword fighting lessons two or three times a week the following year.

On January 11, 2006, she opens her own blog of her own in which she chronicles her path towards becoming an idol. She started attending auditions in February 2006, and was awarded the Grand Prize for the A-Team Crystal Pure Audition and effectively enrolls the agency, where she becomes a gravure model. She also makes her first public television appearance. She then releases her first DVD in Fall 2006 and appears as a model in the weekly tabloid magazine Shūkanshi and also the internet magazine Fashion Walker.

On January 8, 2007, She was featured on Tohoku Broadcasting Company's Evening News TBC show and also interviewed on the Jaikeru Makuson variety program (named after the way the producer's mother said Michael Jackson's name). Later that month on the 28th, Yuriko is chosen to star as the heroine of the Kamen Rider Den-O tokusatsu series. However, she was  replaced in July of that year due to overwork. On February 3, She held a public event to commemorate the release of her second DVD "Face", with an attendance of approximately 220 people, including prominent names in the idol industry. Yuriko announced her retirement from the entertainment industry on February 1, 2013.

References

External links
Yuriko Shiratori's blog 
TOKYOGRAPH

1983 births
Japanese actresses
Japanese television personalities
Japanese gravure idols
Living people
People from Sendai
Japanese bloggers
Japanese women bloggers
21st-century Japanese women writers